Tony Mordente (born December 3, 1935) is an American dancer, choreographer, actor, and television director.

Career
Born in New York City, Mordente attended the High School of Performing Arts and made his professional dance debut at the Jacob's Pillow Dance Festival in Massachusetts. Soon after he joined the ballet company at Radio City Music Hall, where he was discovered by Michael Kidd, who cast him in the 1956 Broadway musical adaptation of the Al Capp comic strip Li'l Abner.

Mordente was then featured in the Broadway (1957) and West End productions and film version of West Side Story, during which time he met his future wife Chita Rivera, who played Anita in the original Broadway cast. In the stage version Mordente played A-Rab, and in the film he played Action. "He wanted to play his original role in the movie and was very disappointed to be Action and I asked why they switched his role," Seth Rudetsky wrote in Playbill. "He said he never asked because sometimes you ask and you don’t like the answer. Regardless, he wound up being very featured in the movie."

Rudetsky said the actors told him that the Broadway cast had specific instructions that the Sharks and Jets were not allowed to fraternize. "Well, not only did [Rivera] fraternize with a Jet (Tony Mordente), they wound up having a daughter (Lisa Mordente)! Chita remembers seeing Tony in rehearsal and feeling like he literally flew."

Mordente was the voice of Oliver Cool on the 45 rpm single recording, "Oliver Cool" b/w "I Like Girls" by Oliver Cool (Roulette R-4292). The record did not chart nationally in the US but was a big hit in Australia in 1961.

He understudied the title role and served as assistant to Gower Champion in Bye Bye Birdie (1960) He next teamed again with Kidd for Ben Franklin in Paris (1964) and the ill-fated Breakfast at Tiffany's (1966), which closed during previews. He received his first credit as sole choreographer for Here's Where I Belong (1968), which never made it past opening night.

As an actor, Mordente appeared in the film Love with the Proper Stranger (1963) and had guest appearances on the tv series Combat! and The Outer Limits. He began to choreograph for television variety shows, including The Ed Sullivan Show and The Sonny & Cher Comedy Hour.

In the mid-1970s, Mordente switched gears and began to direct for television. His credits include twenty-nine episodes of Rhoda, ten episodes of Matlock, thirty-seven episodes of Walker, Texas Ranger, five episodes of The A-Team, four episodes of The Love Boat, and thirty-three episodes of 7th Heaven, in addition to episodes of The Practice (1976), Busting Loose, Love, Sidney, Family Ties, Day by Day, M*A*S*H, and Burke's Law, among other television shows.

Family
Mordente was married to Chita Rivera from 1957 to 1966. They are the parents of actress Lisa Mordente.

He married Jean G. Fraser in 1978. They are the parents of screenwriter Adriana Mordente.

References

External links
 
 

1935 births
American choreographers
American male dancers
American male film actors
American male musical theatre actors
American male stage actors
American male television actors
American people of Italian descent
American television directors
Living people
Singers from New York City
Fiorello H. LaGuardia High School alumni